Murchison is a settlement in the Ugu District Municipality in KwaZulu-Natal, South Africa.

Geography
Murchison is located on the South Coast of KwaZulu-Natal approximately 13 kilometres west of Port Shepstone. It borders the villages of Madakana, Mbotsha, Mdlanzi, Mtengwana and Boboyi.

Health facilities
Murchison is home to the Murchison District Hospital which a 300-bed public hospital serving the surrounding rural district. The hospital was opened in 1943 by Mr D. Mitchell.

Roads
Murchison lies on the N2 national route to Port Shepstone and Durban in the east and Kokstad and Mthatha in the west. It also connects to the other smaller towns in the inner South Coast such as Ezinqoleni and Harding and the R61 on the coast which further connects to the beach resort towns of Margate and Port Edward.

References

Populated places in KwaZulu-Natal